Shepherd Hill is an unincorporated community in Lee County, Virginia, in the United States.

History
Shepherd Hill was named for the Shepherd family of pioneer settlers.

References

Unincorporated communities in Lee County, Virginia
Unincorporated communities in Virginia